Ho-Sung Pak (born November 8, 1967) is a Korean-American film actor, stunt performer, martial artist, action choreographer, game character, writer, and producer.

Life and career
Pak, a Korean American, was born in Chicago, Illinois. He played lead character Liu Kang in the first Mortal Kombat and Mortal Kombat II, as well as the original elderly version of Shang Tsung in the first game. He was a stunt coordinator for the movie Teenage Mutant Ninja Turtles II: The Secret of the Ooze as well as a stunt double for Raphael; he later reprised his role of stunt double in the movie Teenage Mutant Ninja Turtles III.

Pak, along with other actors from the first two Mortal Kombat games, refused to appear in Mortal Kombat 3 due to a royalty dispute with developer Midway over the use of their likenesses across various console versions of the first two games, resulting in the casting of new actors for some of the returning characters. In 1995, Pak and fellow Mortal Kombat actors Daniel Pesina, Katalin Zamiar, and Phillip Ahn lent their likenesses to a fighting game produced exclusively for the Atari Jaguar titled Thea Realm Fighters, but it was cancelled after Atari discontinued the failed system later that year.

In 2002, he played the leading role in the martial arts movie Book of Swords. In it he portrayed Lang, an Asian cop who after witnessing the death of his brother during a drug bust gone wrong, leaves town only to come back three years later for revenge. The movie also starred MK actors Daniel Pesina, Katalin Zamiar and Richard Divizio. In a nod to his Mortal Kombat alter ego Liu Kang, Pak is shown wearing a red headband during the final part of the movie, while the other three actors are also seen in similar MK clothing/roles throughout the movie.

In 2004 Pak starred in the martial film Lesser of Three Evils, directed by Wayne A. Kennedy, also starring Roger Guenveur Smith, Peter Greene, Rosa Blasi  and Sherilyn Fenn. The film was produced by Ho-Sung Pak, Wayne A. Kennedy and Matthew Chausse who created together the film company GenOne. It was released in 2009 under the title Fist of the Warrior.

In the 1995-1997 TV show WMAC Masters, his ki-symbol was "Superstar", which is a translation of his given Korean name. The show featured his older brother, Ho Young Pak ("Star Warrior"), as well as fellow Mortal Kombat actors Chris Casamassa ("Red Dragon") and Hakim Alston ("The Machine").

Filmography

References

External links
 
The Book of Swords (2003)
Lost Games: Thea Realm Fighters
Ho-Sung Pak-interview on (re)Search my Trash

1967 births
American male film actors
American martial artists
American male television actors
American male video game actors
South Korean emigrants to the United States
Living people
People from Seoul
Action choreographers
American male actors of Korean descent